"September" is a song by Canadian singer Deborah Cox. It was written by Cox along with Gordon Chambers, Teddy "Sonny Boy" Turpin and Stevie J for her second studio album One Wish (1998), while production was overseen by the latter. Released as the album's fifth single, it peaked at number 37 on the Billboard Adult R&B Songs chart.

Charts

References

1998 songs
1999 singles
Deborah Cox songs
Songs written by Deborah Cox
Songs written by Stevie J
Songs written by Gordon Chambers
Arista Records singles